Joicey is a surname. Notable people with the name include:

Brian Joicey (born 1945), retired English footballer
Nicholas Joicey (born 1970), British government official
James Joicey (disambiguation), multiple people

See also
Baron Joicey, a noble title in the Peerage of the United Kingdom
Joice (disambiguation)